The Jordan 192 was a Formula One car designed by Gary Anderson and used by the Jordan team in the 1992 Formula One World Championship. The number 32 car was driven by Italian Stefano Modena and the number 33 car by Brazilian Maurício Gugelmin, both new to the team.

After a successful debut season in  the team lost their supply of Ford engines due to large debts. Instead Jordan signed a contract to run the Yamaha OX99 3.5L V12, which was supplied for free. One of the problems was that the team had already begun work on the 192 in the expectation that it would continue to run the Ford V8 rather than the much larger Yamaha V12. The team's new main sponsor was Sasol, replacing 7UP.

Compared to 1991, 1992 was a disastrous season for Jordan. The team struggled badly with reliability issues (in particular overheating), with Gugelmin retiring from seven of the first nine races and Modena failing to finish a race until the twelfth race of the season in Belgium. Modena also failed to qualify four times. The team did not score a point until the final race of the season in Australia, when Modena finished sixth. With this one point, Jordan placed 11th in the Constructors' Championship.

Complete Formula One results 

(Key) Results in bold indicate pole position and results in italics indicate fastest lap in race.

References

External links 

 Jordan 192 - Formula One DataBase
 Jordan 192 - ChicaneF1
 Jordan 192 - F1Olivier

1992 Formula One season cars
Jordan Formula One cars